HMS Lenox was a 74-gun third rate ship of the line of the Royal Navy, launched on 25 February 1758 at Chatham Dockyard.

She was sunk as a breakwater in 1784.

Notes

References

Lavery, Brian (2003) The Ship of the Line – Volume 1: The development of the battlefleet 1650–1850. Conway Maritime Press. .

Ships of the line of the Royal Navy
Dublin-class ships of the line
1758 ships
Ships sunk as breakwaters